Bolanle Austen-Peters (born 4 February 1969), is a Nigerian movie director, theater producer and cultural entrepreneur. She is the founder and artistic director of BAP Productions and the arts and culture center Terra Kulture in Lagos. She has been described by the CNN as the "woman pioneering theater in Nigeria", named one of the most influential women in Africa by Forbes Afrique and been recognised with several awards for her contribution to the arts.

Early life and career
Austen-Peters was born in 1969 in Ibadan, the Oyo State in the south-western region of Nigeria. She is the daughter of Emmanuel Afe Babalola, a Senior Advocate of Nigeria and Rtd Major, Mrs Bisi Babalola. She gained a BA in Law from the University of Lagos and an MA from London School of Economics and Political Science. In the 1990s she worked as a lawyer in Afe Babalola and Co Barristers and Solicitors and with the United Nations High Commissioner for Refugees in Switzerland .

In 2003, she founded Terra Kulture, an educational and cultural hub for Nigerian languages, arts, and culture. It includes a restaurant, art gallery, auction house, bookstore, language school, theater, film production studio, and Academy for the study of art. Located on Tiamiyu Savage Street in Lagos, its Arena is the first privately owned theater in Nigeria.

In 2013, she established her own production company Bolanle Austen-Peters Productions (BAP Productions). BAP Production is the production house, set up to change the narrative about Africa by promoting women as example from FRK, Fela and the Kalakuta queens; social issues e.g The Bling Lagosians and Collision Course (2021 film) and 93 Days. The company entered the Nigerian theater industry with its first production Saro, the musical. The musical was staged in Lagos and in 2016 went on tour to London's West End.  The musical tells the story of four young men who decide to embark on a journey to Lagos where they seek to realize their dreams.

In 2015, Austen-Peters produced the film 93 Days . It tells the story of the Ebola outbreak in Nigeria and premiered on 13 September 2016 in Lagos. It was shown at the Toronto International Film Festival, The Chicago Film Festival, the Pan African Film Festival in Los Angeles, the Johannesburg Film Festival, and at the Africa Film Festival in Cologne/Germany, and nominated for a Rapid Lion Award. It won the award for Best Lighting Designer at the 2017 Africa Magic Viewers Choice Awards, and received thirteen nominations. 93 days was also nominated for the Rapid Lion Award and in 7 categories for the 2017 African Movie Academy Awards, which was the highest nominated film in 2017 AMAA.

In 2016, Austen-Peters directed the musical Wakaa, which tells the story of the trials, successes and experiences of a group of graduate students. It was the first Nigerian musical to be staged in London’s West End, and recorded sold out shows at the Shaw theatre in London.

In 2017, Austen-Peters directed the musical Fela and The Kalakuta Queens. It chronicles the life of the Afrobeat legend Fela Kuti, and the women that were an integral part of his band. It was produced and created with the support of Fela Kuti’s estate. It was shown in Nigeria, Egypt and South Africa. The musical is one of the biggest to come out of Africa with over 120,000 people having watched it.

In 2019, Austen-Peters directed the film Bling Lagosians which the individual feuds within a wealthy Lagos family.. It was nominated for two awards including Best Art Director, Africa Magic Viewers' Choice Awards. It starred Nollywood actors and actresses including Elvina Ibru, Toyin Abraham, Jide Kosoko, Bisola Aiyeola, Denola Grey, Monalisa Chinda, Osas Ighodaro Ajibade, Sharon Ooja, Helen Paul and Alex Ekubo.

In the same year, she also directed the musical ‘Man Enough’ which is a monologue in three voices; a man crying to be heard, a man yelling to be saved from a world that thinks he is ‘Superman’ and a man fearing to speak. It is a story of a man proving his worth and when he is man enough.

In 2020, Austen-Peters directed the movie Collision Course which tells the story of the lives of a law enforcement agent and an aspiring musician in Nigeria. It was shown on Netflix and won Best Movie (West Africa) at the Africa Magic Viewers’ Choice Awards and was nominated for four awards including Best Film, Africa International Film Festival AFRIFF (2021), Best Performance in a Film, AFRIFF (2021), Best Performance in a Film, AMA (2021). It starred Chioma Chukwuka Akpotha, Ade Laoye, Kenneth Okolie, Daniel Etim Effiong, Bimbo Manuel, Gregory Ojefua, Bamike Olawunmi-Adenibuyan, Kalu Ikeagwu and Nobert Young. 

In 2021, Austen-Peters directed the movie Man of God (2022 film) which tells the story of a man who is caught between religion, expectations and his own belief. The movie was produced for Netflix and became the most viewed movie of the month. It stars the actors Akah Nnani, Osas Ighodaro, Prince Nelson Enwerem, Dorcas Shola Fapson, Atlanta Bridget Johnson, Patrick Doyle, Jude Chukwuka, Eucharia Anunobi, Shawn Faqua, Mawuli Gavor and Olumide Oworu.

Philanthropy
She founded Terra Academy For The Arts (TAFTA) in partnership with MasterCard foundation to train 65,000 young adults over five years. Terra Academy for the arts offers FREE education to its students in sound, stage and set design, animation and scriptwriting.

Austen-Peters has collaborated closely with the Nigerian Ministry of Culture to empower the creative industries through jobs and artistic projects. She was in 2015 recognised with the Award in Appreciation of Contribution to the Development of National Museum, Onikan, Lagos. In 2017, she collaborated with Lagos State Government to celebrate Lagos 50th anniversary. More than 9 sculptures were commissioned and placed around Lagos to bring light to the city’s history, culture and people. Perhaps the most well-known sculpture is Nigerian artist Abolore Sobayo’s sculpture of Afrobeat icon Fela Kuti. The sculpture salutes every Lagosian who has at one time or the other, fought for liberation. The sculpture is a celebration of Lagos and recognises the struggle of its citizens. Some of the other artists included in the project were Ade Odunfa, Hamza Atta, Segun Aiyesan, Umeh Bede, Gerald Chukwuma, Tayo Olayode and Terfa Adingi. She has been involved in the preservation and development of Nigerian languages throughout her career, and interviewed Nigerian author and Nobel Prize winner Wole Soyinka for the New York Times. Terra Kulture is collaborating with Mastercard Foundation to support 65,000 young creatives with job opportunities. 

In 2021, Austen-Peters collaborated with Google Arts & Culture, the Nigerian Tourism Development Corporation (NTDC) and six cultural institutions to celebrate the city of Lagos and it’s creative communities. The project ‘Èkó for Show: Explore Lagos’ highlighted the young generation of talented individuals and communities spanning music, art, photography, fashion, theatre, literature and food. Terra Kulture contributed with Street View imagery, photographs, videos and immersive stories about Lagos cultural hub. For the project launch, Austen-Peters created a dedicated behind-the-scenes YouTube series with Afrobeats artists Teni, Kizz Daniel and Reekado Banks, explaining their creative journey.

Personal life
She is married to Adegboyega Austen-Peters, a Nigerian executive and board member. They have a son and daughter, and live in Lagos, Nigeria.

See also
 List of Nigerian actors
 List of Nigerian film producers
 List of Nigerian film directors
 Nollywood

References

1969 births
Living people
21st-century Nigerian businesswomen
21st-century Nigerian businesspeople
University of Lagos alumni
Alumni of the London School of Economics
International School, Ibadan alumni
Nigerian women lawyers
Nigerian women company founders
Nigerian theatre managers and producers
Nigerian officials of the United Nations
Businesspeople from Lagos
Yoruba women filmmakers
Nigerian women film producers
Nigerian film directors